Roberto Cabral (born 18 June 1952 in Córdoba, Argentina) is an Argentine former football striker.

References

External links
 Roberto Cabral at BDFA.com.ar 
 Profile 

1952 births
Living people
Argentine footballers
Argentine expatriate footballers
Association football forwards
Club Atlético Platense footballers
Club Atlético Huracán footballers
Rosario Central footballers
K. Beerschot V.A.C. players
Lille OSC players
Expatriate footballers in Belgium
Expatriate footballers in France
Belgian Pro League players
Ligue 1 players
Argentine Primera División players
Club Atlético Independiente footballers
Clermont Foot players
Argentine expatriate sportspeople in France
Pan American Games medalists in football
Pan American Games gold medalists for Argentina
Footballers at the 1971 Pan American Games
Medalists at the 1971 Pan American Games
Footballers from Córdoba, Argentina
Argentine expatriate sportspeople in Belgium